The Rochester-Beaver Railroad Bridge spans the Beaver River between the boroughs of Rochester, Pennsylvania and Bridgewater, Pennsylvania. It is the second railroad bridge to be constructed on this site and carries one track (formerly two) of the Cleveland Line of Norfolk Southern Railway. The structure is only about 100 feet from the river's mouth at its confluence with the Ohio River. 

Bridges in Beaver County, Pennsylvania
Railroad bridges in Pennsylvania
Bridges over the Beaver River (Pennsylvania)
Warren truss bridges in the United States